Frederick Musiiwa Makamure Shava (born 20 March 1949) is a Zimbabwean politician who was appointed Minister of Foreign Affairs and International Trade in February 2021 and sworn in on 2 March 2021. He also serves as a member of the Senate representing Midlands Province, having been sworn in on 17 March 2021. He replaced the late Sibusiso Moyo in both the Senate and as foreign minister.

Prior to his appointment, Shava served as Zimbabwe's representative to the United Nations, where he was the President of the UN Economic and Social Affairs Council. Shava also served in Robert Mugabe's government as the Minister of Labour, Manpower Planning and Development from 1981 to 1986 and Minister of State for Political Affairs in 1987. While a cabinet minister in the Mugabe government, Shava was convicted for perjury in the Willowgate motor scandal, a matter that he was later pardoned for by the president. He also served as Zimbabwe's ambassador to China from 2007 to 2014.

Early life and education
Shava was born on 20 March 1949 in Chivi, in what was then the colony of Southern Rhodesia. He attended secondary school at St. Ignatius College in Chishawasha, and went on to earn a Bachelor of Science in biology from the University of Zambia or the University of Zimbabwe. He also holds a Master of Science in nematology from Imperial College London and a Master of Philosophy and Doctor of Philosophy, both in parasitology, from Royal Holloway College.

References

1949 births
Living people
20th-century Zimbabwean politicians
21st-century Zimbabwean politicians
Alumni of Imperial College London
Alumni of the University of London
Ambassadors of Zimbabwe to China
Foreign ministers of Zimbabwe
Members of the National Assembly of Zimbabwe
Members of the Senate of Zimbabwe
People from Masvingo Province
ZANU–PF politicians
Zimbabwean officials of the United Nations